7C may refer to:

7C (TV series)
Jeju Air, a Korean airline with IATA code 7C
Seventh Cambridge Survey, an astronomical radio source survey
Percent-encoded pipe character (|), as represented in hexadecimal
Transfăgărășan, a Romanian highway
Terror of the Vervoids and The Ultimate Foe, Doctor Who serials with production code 7C

See also
C7 (disambiguation)